Alfred Sandeman (1 January 181926 January 1883) was a politician in the Colony of Queensland, Australia, representing Port Curtis in the Queensland Legislative Assembly.

Politics
In 1861, the sitting member for the electoral district of Port Curtis in the Queensland Legislative Assembly Charles Fitzsimmons resigned, resulting in a by-election on 15 October 1861, at which Alfred Sandeman was elected to replace him.

Sandeman's political career was short-lived, and in February 1863, his constituents called on him to resign, claiming that he rarely attended parliament and did nothing to advance issues of importance to their district. Sandeman resigned on 11 April 1863, triggering a by-election on 12 May 1863, at which John Douglas was elected.

References

Members of the Queensland Legislative Assembly
1819 births
1883 deaths
19th-century Australian politicians